John Davis Tuggle (January 13, 1961 – August 30, 1986) was a running back in the National Football League (NFL). Tuggle was the last selection of the 1983 NFL Draft, selected by the New York Giants. The nickname given to the last player selected in the draft is "Mr. Irrelevant." He played that season with and was awarded the New York Giants Special Teams Player of the Year.

Tuggle played high school football for Independence High School in San Jose, California. The school now holds an annual golf tournament in his memory, as a sports program fundraiser.  He went on to play four seasons for the California Golden Bears as their starting fullback, rushing for 1,813 yards and 16 touchdowns, while also catching 108 passes for 914 yards and 3 scores.  Tuggle earned a spot in the starting lineup in the 4th game of his true freshman season in 1979, helping the team reach the 1979 Garden State Bowl, the school first bowl game appearance since 1959.  Cal lost the game 28-17 and finished with a 6-6 record.  Cal won a combined total of just 4 games during Tuggle's next two seasons, but their 1980 game against Stanford University turned out to be one of the highlights of his career.  With a 2-8 record, Cal entered the game as 15-point underdogs against the 6-4 Cardinals led by future NFL Hall of famer John Elway.  Tuggle rushed 27 times for 110 yards and 2 touchdowns in the game, while also catching two passes for 37 yards as his team upset Stanford 28-23 and ruined the Cardinal’s chance of playing in a bowl game.  In Tuggle's senior season of 1982, he led the team in rushing and helped them achieve a 7-4 record.  In their final game against Stanford, Tuggle had 28 carries for 97 yards, a performance that was largely overshadowed by the game's dramatic ending, known as The Play.

Drafted by the Giants with the last pick of the 1983 draft, Tuggle fought hard to make the roster and secured himself a spot on special teams after some solid plays in the pre-season.  He became the first player in league history picked last in the draft to make the NFL on the team that drafted him. Tuggle played most of the 1983 season on special teams, but was promoted to starting fullback in week 12 when Rob Carpenter was injured. He finished the season with 17 carries for 49 yards and a touchdown, three receptions for 50 yards, and 9 kickoff returns for 156 yards. He was voted special teams player of the year by his teammates.

The offseason in 1984 turned out to be less positive.   Tuggle got divorced from his wife and suffered a knee injury during a workout, resulting in minor surgery.  During the summer, Tuggle and some teammates were involved in a minor car crash when their vehicle struck a telephone pole.  The accident wasn't serious, but Tuggle noticed pain in his shoulder that seemed too significant to be entirely the result of the collision.  Advised to see a doctor by Carpenter, who was with him in the car, Tuggle was soon diagnosed with cancer.  He stayed on the team and continued to work out with them, hoping he could one day return to the field.  "You could tell what a terrible thing his chemotherapy was," said Giants conditioning coach Johnny Parker, "but John actually got stronger, and although it broke your heart to do it, he wanted to be pushed, he didn't want sympathy. In the weight room, John Tuggle was not sick. John Tuggle was a standard."  The Giants advised Tuggle not to report to training camp in 1985, as that way they would not have to cut him from the team and he could continue to collect his salary until his contract expired in February 1986.

In the final months of his life, Tuggle moved in with a college teammate from his days at Cal, telling him he wanted to die in California.  He spent his remaining days undergoing cancer treatment in San Diego and Mexico until his death on August 30, 1986. Though they did not keep him on the team after the 1985 season, the Giants paid for Tuggle's health insurance for the remainder of his life, and wore his number 38 on their helmets during their 1986–87 Super Bowl winning season.

Tuggle was the subject of the 30 for 30 short, The Irrelevant Giant.

References

External links
 

1961 births
1986 deaths
American football running backs
California Golden Bears football players
New York Giants players
Ed Block Courage Award recipients
Players of American football from Honolulu
Players of American football from San Jose, California
Deaths from angiosarcoma
Deaths from cancer in Mexico